The Gonzales–Laver rivalry was a tennis rivalry between Pancho Gonzales and Rod Laver, widely regarded as two of the greatest tennis players of all time. They played against each other from 1964 to 1970, and Laver led their head-to-head rivalry 43-22.

Analysis
Jack Kramer, the long-time tennis promoter, writes that although Laver was "absolutely unbeatable for a year or two late in the 1960s", a "careful comparison" could be made between Laver and the somewhat older Gonzales and that Kramer is "positive that Gonzales could have beaten Laver regularly." 

Kramer sees as evidence of Gonzales's superiority over Laver the fact that Gonzales defeated Laver in a U.S.$10,000 winner-take-all, five-set match before 15,000 spectators in New York City's Madison Square Garden in January 1970, when Gonzales was 41 years old and Laver was still considered the world No. 1 player. On the other hand, Gonzales was still a top ten player when this match occurred and Laver subsequently won this event, beating Gonzales in a straight sets semifinal.

But maybe Laver’s overwhelming dominance in the rivalry, winning 43 of their 65 matches, is a more compelling fact than Kramer’s opinion.

Head-to-head tallies
The following is a breakdown of their documented head-to-head results:

All matches: Laver 43–22
All finals: Laver 14–7
Grand Slams: Laver 1–0
Pro Slams: Laver 2–0

List of matches

See also
List of tennis rivalries

References

Tennis rivalries